Edwin Joseph O'Malley (August 22, 1881 – April 10, 1953) was the Commissioner of Public Markets for New York City.

Biography
Edwin was born on August 22, 1881 in Manhattan, New York City to Thomas Francis O'Malley (1854–1918) and Georgiana Reynolds (1855–1941). He married Alma Feltner (1883–1940) on January 16, 1902 and had one child, a son, Walter Francis O'Malley (1903–1979), who would become the owner of the Brooklyn Dodgers from 1950 to 1979, and who would oversee their controversial move from Brooklyn to Los Angeles.

In 1910 Edwin was living in the Bronx, New York and working as a cotton goods salesman. Around 1911 he moved the family from the Bronx to Hollis, Queens. He registered for the draft on September 12, 1918, but did not serve in World War I. He became a Democratic party ward heeler for Tammany Hall, and was appointed as the Commissioner of Public Markets for New York City by mayor John F. Hylan.  He testified on August 18, 1922 before the Kings County, New York Grand Jury, which was investigating the mishandling of the fees paid by vendors to the Public Markets office. No charges were filed.

He died of a heart attack in Amityville, New York on April 10, 1953.

Further reading
Roger Kahn; The Era 1947-1957: When the Yankees, the Giants, and the Dodgers Ruled the World. 
Burton Alan Boxerman; Ebbets to Veeck to Busch: Eight Owners Who Shaped Baseball. 
Henry D. Fetter; Taking on the Yankees: Winning and Losing in the Business of Baseball, 1903-2003. .

Court cases
Schumaker v. O'Malley; May 1, 1920
Matter of Joerger v. O'Malley; December 1, 1923

References

1881 births
1955 deaths
Edwin Joseph
People from the Bronx
People from Long Island
Commissioners of Public Markets
Politicians from New York City
People from Hollis, Queens
New York (state) Democrats